On the Quiet is a lost 1918 American silent comedy film produced by Famous Players-Lasky and released by Paramount Pictures. It was directed by Chester Withey and starred John Barrymore. The film, based on an original 1901 play, was written by Augustus Thomas and  served as a popular hit for William Collier, Sr.

Plot
As described in a film magazine, Robert Ridgway (Barrymore) is in love with Agnes Colt (Meredith), but her brother who is the guardian of her estate objects to Robert's wild escapades. They are married on the quiet. Robert goes back to college and promises to be good. Agnes's sister is jealous of her husband, a Duke, and to test their love the Duke holds a party in Robert's room. Agnes visits Robert while the party is in progress, and when her brother discovers her absence he goes to hunt her up. Robert and Agnes escape to a life saving station, don diving helmets, and hide at the bottom of the sea. Meanwhile, McGeachy (Belcher), who was a witness at the wedding, explains everything.

Cast
John Barrymore as Robert Ridgway
Lois Meredith as Agnes Colt
Frank Losee as Judge Ridgway
J.W. Johnston as Horace Colt
Alfred Hickman as Hix
Helen Greene as Ethel Colt
Cyril Chadwick as Duke of Carbonddale
Frank Belcher as McGeachy
Nan Christy as Chorus Girl
Dell Boone as Chorus Girl
Dan Mason as Clerk
Frank Hilton as Secretary
Otto Okuga as Valet
Louise Lee as Maid

See also
List of lost films
John Barrymore filmography

References

External links

The AFI Catalog of Feature Films:  On the Quiet
On the Quiet synopsis at AllMovie
 The Topeka Daily State Journal, Saturday Evening November 9 1918 (Library of Congress)
 lobby poster Paramount

1918 films
American silent feature films
Famous Players-Lasky films
Films directed by Chester Withey
American films based on plays
Lost American films
1918 comedy films
American black-and-white films
Silent American comedy films
1918 lost films
Lost comedy films
1910s American films